Edwin Jed Fish Gould III (born July 15, 1955), known to radio listeners as "Jed the Fish", is a disc jockey who hosted afternoon drive on KROQ-FM in Los Angeles, from 1978 to 2012. Known for his maniacal laugh and biting humor, he interviewed seminal alternative acts such as Brian Eno, David Bowie, Sting, and Elvis Costello, and is sometimes credited as the first DJ on KROQ to play the Offspring's "Come Out and Play". An early supporter of new wave and alternative bands, Jed the Fish is reputed to have been the first US DJ to play Depeche Mode, Duran Duran, and the Pretenders, helping KROQ establish itself as an influential radio station of the 1980s and 1990s.

Career 
Jed the Fish began his radio broadcasting career while a student at Casa Grande High School in Casa Grande, Arizona. He earned his First Class Radiotelephone Operator License in 1971 at age 16, programming and hosting a radio program targeted at the "youth market" on KPIN-AM.

From 1994 to July 2013, Jed hosted the nationally syndicated show Out of Order. Out of Order is two hours long and is syndicated by Dial Global.

From 2012–2018 Jed the Fish was also an air personality at radio station KCSN, where he programmed his own show.

In 2018, he became a DJ at Los Angeles' KLOS.

In February 2019, Jed the Fish joined the Roq of the 80s lineup on KROQ HD2 station on radio.com on Sundays from 6 pm to midnight PST.

In addition to his on-air work, Jed the Fish produced the Southern California punk band El Centro debut album in 1995 and the remix track “Thing” on Meg Lee Chin’s Junkies and Snakes in 2000.

Awards
In 1997 and 1999, Jed was awarded the Billboard Modern Rock Personality of the Year award.

In 1998, Jed received an award for the Radio & Records Local Modern Rock Personality of the Year.

Jed the Fish was awarded Billboard'''s Major Market Alternative Radio Personality of the year in 1998 and 2000 (in 1999 his co-workers Kevin and Bean received the award). He won Album Network's Alternative All Stars award for Virtuallyalternative Radio Personality in 1999 and 2000.

In 2004, he tied for 8th place along with former 102.7 KIIS-FM DJ Rick Dees as one of LA Radio's top ten most influential radio people described as “amazingly inventive” and "the best pure disc jockey in Los Angeles".

 Personal life 
In 1994, Jed the Fish purchased a 1894 Queen Anne Victorian estate home in Pasadena, California. The estate was featured in Lucille Ball's 1968 film Yours, Mine, Ours.

A graduate of USC's Annenberg School of Journalism with a Bachelor of Arts Degree in Broadcast Journalism in 1978, Jed is also an accomplished drummer, even sitting in on drums for John Dolmayan during the KROQ Weenie Roast performance of System of a Down in 2002.

Other media
Jed the Fish is shown on the cover of Reel Big Fish's album, Turn The Radio OffJed the Fish appears as himself in the game show "Win, Lose, or Draw: KRTH vs KROQ" in 1988
Jed the Fish appears as a Radio Announcer in the film Night Angel in 1990
Jed the Fish appears as himself in 1984 in Surf II 
Jed the Fish appears as himself in the 2003 documentary Mayor of the Sunset Strip'', about Rodney Bingenheimer

References

External links

Jed's Catch at KROQ

Living people
1955 births
American radio DJs